Waddilove is a surname. Notable people with the surname include:

Charles Waddilove (1828–1896), British Royal Navy officer 
Darley Waddilove (1736–1828), British deacon
Sean Waddilove, (born 1997) Irish Olympic sailor

See also
Waddilove High School, Methodist High School in Marondera, Zimbabwe
The Way I Loved You (disambiguation)

References

Surnames
English-language surnames
Surnames of English origin
Surnames of British Isles origin